Sir John William Pitt Muir Mackenzie  (19 March 1854 – 25 October 1916) was the acting governor of Bombay during the British Raj from 27 July 1907 to 18 October 1907.

Biography
John Muir Mackenzie was born in France in 1854. The son of Sir John William Pitt Muir Mackenzie, 2nd Baronet, he was educated at Eton College. An older brother was Kenneth Muir Mackenzie, 1st Baron Muir Mackenzie.

He died at his home in London on 25 October 1916. His son-in-law was the cricketer and soldier William Drysdale.

References

 

1916 deaths
1854 births
Governors of Bombay
Knights Commander of the Order of the Star of India
People from Perthshire
Members of the Bombay Legislative Council
Indian Civil Service (British India) officers